Reginald Norman Werner (23 August 1885 – 26 June 1952) was an Australian rules footballer who played with Melbourne in the Victorian Football League (VFL).

Notes

External links 

Reg Werner at Demonwiki

1885 births
1952 deaths
Australian rules footballers from Victoria (Australia)
Melbourne Football Club players